Isaac of Stella, also referred to as Isaac de l'Étoile, (c. 1100, in England – c. 1170s, Étoile, Archigny, France) was a monk, theologian and philosopher.

Life
Born in England, after studies in Paris, he joined the Order of Cistercians, during the reforms of Saint Bernard of Clairvaux, probably at Pontigny. In 1147 he became abbot of the small monastery of Stella, outside Poitiers.

At some time in his later career, most likely in 1167, he left Stella to set up a monastery on the Île de Ré on the Atlantic coast. He later returned to Stella. It is known he lived at Stella on into the 1170s because in one of his sermons he refers to meeting 'Saint' Bernard - and Bernard was only canonised in 1174.

Isaac's most popular work was an allegorical commentary on the canon of the Mass in the form  of a letter to John of Canterbury, bishop of Poitiers. His 55 surviving sermons (and three sermon fragments), as well as his Letter to Alcher on the Soul, constitute his real theological contribution. The Letter (1962) was addressed to Alcher of Clairvaux, and combined Aristotelian and Neoplatonic theories about psychology with Christian mysticism. It exercised a significant role in later mystical speculation due to the incorporation of large sections of Isaac's work in the anthropological compendium known as De spiritu et anima (The Spirit and the Soul), which circulated under the name of Augustine and was widely used in the 13th century.

Isaac's works make use of logical argumentation, influenced by Augustine of Hippo's Neoplatonism.

References

Sources

Bernard McGinn, The Growth of Mysticism, (1994), pp286–296
Bernard McGinn, The Golden Chain: A Study in the Theological Anthropology of Isaac of Stella, (Washington, DC: Cistercian Publications, 1972)
J.-P. Migne, Patrologia Latina 194

Translations
The Selected Works of Isaac of Stella: A Cistercian Voice from the Twelfth Century, tr. D Deme, (Aldershot: Ashgate, 2007)
Sermons for the Christian Year, tr. H McCaffrey, (Kalamazoo, MI: Cistercian Publications, 1979)
Epistola de anima, in B McGinn (tr), Three Treatises on Man: A Cistercian Anthropology, (Kalamazoo, MI: Cistercian Publications, 1977)

English Cistercians
English theologians
12th-century English people
1100s births
1160s deaths